The Children of Chernobyl Benefit Concert  was held at the Dynama Stadium in Minsk, BSSR on April 23 and 24, 1991, five years after the nuclear reactor's meltdown. The event featured bands from around the world and served to raise awareness of the terrible legacy of Chernobyl disaster as representatives from the United Nations and AEA met to discuss the causes and effects of the disaster with government officials. A documentary called Playing for Time (Let the Requiem Begin) about the concert and related issues was produced by Ian Stewart and narrated by Glenda Jackson.

History
Russian DJ Dimitri Korziouk became concerned about the aftermath of Chernobyl after visiting relatives in 1989. He solicited the help of Liverpool's Katharine Watford Cook, and together they came up with the idea to hold a benefit concert. As UK Production Manager, Cook contacted a colleague who managed Guy Pratt and Gary Wallis of Pink Floyd (post Roger Waters era); in return they went to Belarus with Korziouk to present the idea to Stanislav Shushkevich, an official head of the Supreme Soviet of BSSR. Later an agreement was signed between MAAP International and the Belarus Ministry of Culture. At the same time, MAAP International and the Daily Express Newspaper began administering the UK's Children of Chernobyl Charity.

David A. Stewart from Eurythmics served as the charity's chairman, and the UK artists involved included Echo & The Bunnymen, China Crisis, Lindisfarne, Martin Chambers of The Pretenders, Sian, The Big Still and The Real East. Bands from South Africa and the USA also participated, along with Russian stars, including Boris Grebenshchikov, DDT and Igor Talkov. Religious charities from the United States were also present.

References

External links

TV Press

Newspapers and Official Documents

Benefit concerts
Aftermath of the Chernobyl disaster
1991 in Belarus